Soul Tree: A Musical Tribute to Toshinobu Kubota is a tribute album by various artists, released on February 25, 2004. The album was a tribute to Japanese singer-songwriter and musician Toshinobu Kubota. The album features performances by BoA, Soul'd Out, The Gospellers, Naniwa Express, Mika Nakashima, Soulhead, Atsushi, Sowele, Skoop On Somebody, Misia, Junpei Shiina with dance man, Rhymester, and Super Butter Dog Marcket. The album charted at number 9 on the Oricon Albums chart.

Track listing
La La La Love Song (performed by BoA and Soul'd Out)
Dance If You Want It (performed by The Gospellers and Naniwa Express)
Missing (performed by Mika Nakashima)
Ryuusei no Sadoru (performed by Soulhead)
Cymbals (performed by Atsushi)
Candy Rain (performed by Sowele)
Cry On Your Smile (performed by Skoop On Somebody)
Indigo Waltz (Live) (performed by Misia)
You Were Mine (performed by Junpei Shiina with dance man)
Tawawa Hit Parade (performed by Rhymester and Super Butter Dog Marcket)

References

2004 compilation albums
Toshinobu Kubota tribute albums